The Order of the Dove (meaning Order of the Pigeon, as the Spanish word paloma is used to refer both doves and pigeons), was a short lived military order which lasted only for a year. It was created by King Juan I of Castile in 1379 to defend the Catholic faith and the Kingdom of Castile.

History 
It had been doubted in the past which king of the Kingdom of Castile had created the order (another option being Henry III of Castile in 1399). The order was dissolved next year of its creation, but regardless of its short life, it became known due to its large feasts which mostly included eating pigeon (the order's namesake).

In fact, those large feasts consisting on eating pigeon meat and the name of the order itself were actually the cause for its downfall.

Only honorable men could become knights of a military order, but the fact is that pigeon, even though popularly eaten, did not have a distinctive reputation, as the pigeon was attached to promiscuity.

The insignia of the order was a chain necklace with an open wing pigeon.

References

Military orders (monastic society)
1379 establishments in Europe
14th-century establishments in Castile
Catholic orders of chivalry